is a song by the Japanese rock band Siam Shade, released in 1997. The song was first released as their sixth single on November 27, 1997, and also featured on their fourth studio album Siam Shade IV - Zero, released on January 21, 1998.

It is the band's best known work and best-selling single, reaching number three on the Oricon Singles Chart, and was the 31st best-selling single of 1998 with 698,520 copies sold. By 2016, this number had grown to over 800,000 copies. The title song was used as the sixth ending theme of the Rurouni Kenshin anime series. The single was reissued in the standard 12 cm CD format on November 14, 2007.

Track listing
All songs written and composed by Siam Shade. Arranged by Masao Akashi.

 Originally the title track's lyrics were written by Hideki, while the music was written by Daita.

Flow version

Flow recorded a cover version of "1/3 no Junjō na Kanjō" for release as their twenty first single on March 9, 2011. The recording features Siam Shade's lead guitarist Daita and was included on their 2011 compilation album Anime Best. The single reached number 20 on the Oricon chart and charted for 4 weeks.

Written and composed by Siam Shade. Arranged by Flow and Daita.

Other cover versions
In 2010, "1/3 no Junjō na Kanjō" was covered by Mikuni Shimokawa for her album Replay! Shimokawa Mikuni Seishun Anison Cover III. Heavy metal musician Eizo Sakamoto covered it for his Super Anime Song Legend of the 1990s album in October. That same month it was covered by both Jani Lane and Acid Black Cherry for the tribute album Siam Shade Tribute, the former being an English-language version.

In 2011, it was covered by Nogod on the compilation Crush! -90's V-Rock Best Hit Cover Songs-, which was released on January 26 and features current visual kei bands covering songs from bands that were important to the '90s visual kei movement. Pop trio Buono! covered it for their album Partenza in August 2011. A cover by Venus appears in the November 2011 rhythm video game Reflec Beat Limelight.

In 2012, the song was covered by both Mr. Big singer Eric Martin and Megamasso singer Inzargi for their respective cover albums. It was also covered that year by Fest Vainqueur for the compilation album Counteraction - V-Rock covered Visual Anime songs Compilation-, which was released on May 23, 2012, and features covers of songs by visual kei bands that were used in anime.

Japanese American singer Kylee recorded an English-language version for her 2013 Japan-only Crazy for You EP. Fantôme Iris, a fictional visual kei band from multimedia franchise Argonavis from BanG Dream!, covered the song in 2021.

References

Anime songs
Japanese rock songs
Japanese-language songs
1997 singles
1997 songs
Sony Music Entertainment Japan singles
Flow (band) songs
2011 singles
Ki/oon Music singles